South Governorate (transliterated:  al-Janub) is one of the governorates of Lebanon.  South Lebanon has a population of 500,000 inhabitants and an area of 929.6 km2. The capital is Sidon. The lowest elevation is sea-level; the highest is 1,000 meters. The local population is religiously diverse and includes Shia and Sunni Muslims, Druze, Eastern Orthodox, Maronite, Protestant, and Greek Catholic Christians. Temperatures can drop to 4 °C during winter with much rain and snow on the higher ground. In the humid summer, temperatures can rise to 30 °C in the coastal areas. The governorate has several rivers: the Litani, Deir El Zahrani, Naqoura, Awali, Qasmiye, and Hasbani. The area is famous for its citrus and banana farms. Its main cities are Sidon, Tyre and Jezzine.

Local attractions and events
The area offers a great number of attractions, including pristine white sandy beaches south of Tyre, and the opportunity to snorkel or dive among submerged Phoenician and Roman ruins near the ancient cities of Sidon and Tyre. Culture-lovers will enjoy the bustling Ottoman-era Pazars, and one can relax after a long day at a seafood restaurant overlooking the Mediterranean. Southern Lebanon also hosts the Tyre festival, which attracts thousands of tourists each year.

Religion in the South Governorate 

Shias make up the majority of the governorate and are the main residents of the Zahrani Tyre districts. Sunnis are the main residents of Saida the capital of the governorate and the third largest city in Lebanon after Beirut and Tripoli. Christians are mainly residents of the Jezzine district and form a small community in the city of Tyre, which is the fourth-most-populous city in Lebanon.

Districts
 Jezzine
 Sidon
 Tyre

Cities
Jezzine
Sidon or Saida
Tyre
Ghazieh

See also
 Southern Lebanon
 Ras al-Ain, Lebanon
 Sarafand
 Temple of Eshmun

References 

 
Governorates of Lebanon